This list represents a sample of American people imprisoned abroad by state and non-state actors, past and present. This list includes both citizens of the United States and legal permanent residents. It represents individuals imprisoned through various channels, including tried crimes and kidnappings. It does not include American prisoners of war or war-time kidnappings.

The Special Presidential Envoy for Hostage Affairs (SPEHA) Roger D. Carstens leads and coordinates activities across the Executive Branch to bring home Americans held hostage in other countries. Non-governmental organizations that advocate for the return of Americans imprisoned abroad include the Richardson Center for Global Engagement, the James Foley Legacy Foundation, and the Bring Our Families Home Campaign.

Africa

Asia

Afghanistan

China

Iran

North Korea

Pakistan

Russia

Middle East

Syria

United Arab Emirates

South America

Venezuela

References 

American people imprisoned abroad
Lists of American people